Tabanus cordiger also known as the plain-eyed grey horsefly is a species of biting horse-fly.

References

Tabanidae
Diptera of Europe
Insects described in 1820
Taxa named by Johann Wilhelm Meigen